The Puerto Rico Open is a professional golf tournament on the PGA Tour that was first played in 2008. It is the only PGA Tour event ever held in Puerto Rico. The tournament is played at the Coco Beach Golf Course  (previously Trump International Golf Club Puerto Rico) which was designed by Tom Kite. From its inception through 2015, it was played in early March as an alternate event to the WGC-Cadillac Championship, but in 2016 it moved to late March, opposite the WGC-Dell Match Play. All four rounds are broadcast on the Golf Channel.

The winner of the Puerto Rico Open earns 300 FedEx Cup points and 24 OWGR points, compared to 550 FedEx Cup and 70-80 OWGR points for World Golf Championships. As an alternate event, the winner does not earn a bid to the Masters, but still receives a two-year exemption on the PGA Tour (compared to three for a WGC event) and entry into the PGA Championship as a Tour winner. In 2015, the prize fund was US$3 million with $540,000 going to the winner.

The Puerto Rico Open is allocated eight additional sponsor exemptions. Four of these are designated for players from Puerto Rico, the Caribbean, Central America, and South America.  The other four additional exemptions are unrestricted.

For 2018 only, the Puerto Rico Open was an unofficial event as a fundraiser for relief efforts after Hurricane Maria, and was played at TPC Dorado Beach.

The event had been considered to have an unofficial "curse" on the PGA Tour, as no winner of the event had ever gone on to win another tournament. The only exception to this was Michael Bradley who won the Puerto Rico Open for a second time in 2011, after winning his first in 2009, but never won another PGA Tour event. However, Viktor Hovland broke the "curse" when he went on to win the Mayakoba Golf Classic in December 2020, having won the Puerto Rico Open earlier in the year.

History
A Puerto Rico Open was played between 1956 and 1967. It was a fixture on the PGA-sponsored Caribbean Tour until 1965, after which sponsors rescheduled the event to later in the calendar year. The Puerto Rico Open was revived as a stop on the Tour de las Américas 2004 and 2005, before being reincarnated as a PGA Tour event in 2008.

Winners

Note: Green highlight indicates scoring records.

Notes

References

External links

Coverage on PGA Tour's official site

PGA Tour events
Golf tournaments in Puerto Rico